The Istituto Italiano di Cultura, the Italian Cultural Institute in English, is a worldwide non-profit organization created by the Italian government. It promotes Italian culture and is involved in the teaching of the Italian language. The creation of the institute was in response to the desire for a deeper understanding of Italian culture throughout many continents. By organising cultural activities it supports the work carried out by the Italian Embassies and Consulates. There are 85 Italian Cultural Institutes throughout major cities around the world.

General functions of the Institute 
According to the provisions of the law 401/90, article 8 and the regulation 392/95,the Italian Cultural Institutes have the following functions:

To establish contacts with institutions, agencies and organizations of the cultural and scientific environment of the hosting country and to promote proposals and projects with the aim of knowing the Italian culture and facts oriented to cultural and scientific collaborations.
To provide documentation and information about the Italian cultural life and connected institutions.
To promote initiatives, cultural manifestations and exhibitions.
To support initiatives aimed at cultural development of the Italian communities abroad, in order to encourage their integration in the hosting country as well as cultural relationship with the home country. 
To assure collaboration with scholars and Italian students in their research activities and study abroad.
To promote and support initiatives for the Italian language diffusion abroad, making use of Italian lecturers at the hosting country’s universities.

Headquarters in the world 

The Italian Cultural Institute has numerous main offices all over the world, that assure an extensive coverage of the Italian culture and language diffusion.
Each Italian Cultural Institute is the Cultural Section of the Consulate General of Italy in that city. The current premises have a historical value and they belong to the Italian Government. The Institute is a centre for cultural and academic activities, a school of Italian language and civilization, a source of information about contemporary Italy, its regions and its multilayered cultural heritage as well as a venue for art exhibitions, lectures, films, and video screenings.

In addition, the Institute provides the opportunity for cultural collaboration between Italian and foreign organizations and individuals, in order to facilitate exchange in the field of theatre, music and cinema. It offers information and logistical support to both Italian and foreign public and private operators interested in Italian cultural events. The Institute supports initiatives which favour intercultural and multilateral dialogue based on the principles of democracy, reciprocal respect and international solidarity and it is often involved in events organized by other cultural offices of the EU countries.

Locations
Supported mainly by the Italian Ministry of Foreign Affairs, the Italian Cultural Institutes are 85 worldwide.

Europe
 Amsterdam, Netherlands
 Athens, Greece
 Barcelona, Spain
 Belgrade, Serbia
 Berlin, Germany
 Bratislava, Slovakia
 Brussels, Belgium
 Bucharest, Romania
 Budapest, Hungary
 Cologne, Germany
 Copenhagen, Denmark
 Dublin, Ireland
 Edinburgh, Scotland
 Hamburg, Germany
 Helsinki, Finland
 Istanbul, Turkey
 Kyiv, Ukraine
Kraków, Poland
 La Valletta, Malta
 Lisbon, Portugal
 Ljubljana, Slovenia
 London, England: Italian Cultural Institute, London
 Lyon, France
 Madrid, Spain
 Marseilles, France
 Munich, Germany
 Moscow, Russia
 Oslo, Norway
 Paris, France
 Prague, Czech Republic
 Saint Petersburg, Russia
 Sofia, Bulgaria
 Stockholm, Sweden
 Strasbourg, France
 Stuttgart, Germany
 Tirana, Albania
 Vienna, Austria
 Vilnius, Lithuania
 Warsaw , Poland
 Zagreb, Croatia
 Zürich, Switzerland

Africa 
 Addis Ababa, Ethiopia
 Algiers, Algeria
 Cairo, Egypt
 Dakar, Senegal
 Nairobi, Kenya
 Pretoria, South Africa
 Rabat, Morocco
 Tripoli, Libya
 Tunis, Tunisia

Asia and Oceania 
 Abu Dhabi, United Arab Emirates
 Baghdad, Iraq
 Beijing, China
 Beirut, Liban
 Damascus, Syria
 Jakarta, Indonesia
 Haifa, Israel
 Hong Kong, China
 Melbourne, Australia
 Mumbai, India
 New Delhi, India
 Osaka, Japan
 Seoul, South Korea
 Shanghai, China
 Sydney, Australia
 Tel Aviv, Israel
 Tokyo, Japan

Americas 
 Bogotá, Colombia
 Buenos Aires, Argentina
 Caracas, Venezuela
 Chicago, United States
 Córdoba, Argentina
 Guatemala City, Guatemala
 Lima, Peru
 Los Angeles, United States
 Mexico City, Mexico
 Montevideo, Uruguay
 Montréal, Canada
 New York City, United States
 Rio de Janeiro, Brazil
 San Francisco, United States
 Santiago, Chile
 São Paulo, Brazil
 Toronto, Canada
 Washington D.C., United States

No longer active 
 Accra, Ghana
 Ankara, Turkey
 Frankfurt, Germany
 Grenoble, France
 Innsbruck, Austria
 Kyoto, Japan
 Lille, France
 Luxembourg City, Luxembourg
 Mogadishu, Somalia
 Singapore, Singapore
 Thessaloniki, Greece
 Vancouver, Canada
 Wolfsburg, Germany

See also 
 Cultural Diplomacy
 Public diplomacy
 British Council
 Alliance Française
 Goethe-Institut
 Instituto Cervantes

References

External links
Map of all Istituto Italiano di Cultura branches worldwide

Italian culture
Cultural promotion organizations
Government agencies of Italy
Italian-language education